Multidrug and toxin extrusion protein 2 is a protein which in humans is encoded by the SLC47A2 gene.

Function 

This gene encodes a protein belonging to a family of transporters involved in excretion of toxic electrolytes, both endogenous and exogenous, through urine and bile. This transporter family shares homology with the bacterial MATE (multi antimicrobial extrusion protein or multidrug and toxic compound extrusion) protein family responsible for drug resistance. This gene is one of two members of the MATE transporter family located near each other on chromosome 17. Alternatively spliced transcript variants encoding different isoforms have been identified for this gene.

Discovery 

The multidrug efflux transporter NorM from V. parahaemolyticus which mediates resistance to multiple antimicrobial agents (norfloxacin, kanamycin, ethidium bromide etc.) and its homologue from E. coli were identified in 1998. NorM seems to function as drug/sodium antiporter which is the first example of Na+-coupled multidrug efflux transporter discovered. NorM is a prototype of a new transporter family and Brown et al. named it the multidrug and toxic compound extrusion family. The X-ray structure of the NorM was determined to 3.65 Å, revealing an outward-facing conformation with two portals open to the outer leaflet of the membrane and a unique topology of the predicted 12 transmembrane helices distinct from any other known multidrug resistance transporter.

References

Further reading 

 
 
 
 
 

Solute carrier family